The Bulkin Trail is a 1992, 25 minute  Christmas short directed by Michael J. Nathanson.

The movie stars David Hasselhoff and centers around a man named Dimitri and his younger sister, Evelyn.

Parts of the film were shot in Park City, Utah.

In 1994, the film was nominated for a Young Artist Award for Outstanding Family TV Special, M.O.W. or Mini-Series.

References

1992 short films
1992  films
Christmas television films
Films shot in Utah